Jeffrey Hardy (born 20 May 1966) is an Indigenous Australian former professional rugby league footballer who played in the 1980s and 1990s.

Playing career

Playing in the back row, Hardy represented the Illawarra Steelers between 1985 and 1989 and the St George Dragons from 1991 to 1998.
A St. George junior from the Brighton Seagulls junior club, Hardy went on to play in two Grand Finals in 1992 and 1993 . Hardy played in a third grand-final loss with the St. George Dragons in 1996. Hardy was a favourite player with all Dragons fans during his period at the club.  Hardy played in St. George's final game before they formed a joint venture with the Illawarra Steelers to become St. George Illawarra.  A semi-final loss to Canterbury-Bankstown at Kogarah Oval.

Hardy also had a career in England playing for Sheffield Eagles (1989-1990 and 1999), Castleford (Heritage № 684) (1990-1991) and the Huddersfield Giants (2000). He retired in 2001 after a long and successful club career. After retiring he went on to coach Endeavour Sports High School's Australian schoolboys rugby team.

EnglishCounty Cup Final appearances

Hardy played right-, i.e. number 12, in Castleford's 11–8 victory over Wakefield Trinity in the 1990 Yorkshire County Cup Final during the 1990–91 season at Elland Road, Leeds on Sunday 23 September 1990.

References

External links
 Jeff Hardy Yesterdays Hero
 Statistics at rugbyleagueproject.org

1966 births
Living people
Australian rugby league players
Castleford Tigers players
Huddersfield Giants players
Illawarra Steelers players
Indigenous Australian rugby league players
Rugby league locks
Rugby league players from Sydney
Sheffield Eagles (1984) players
St. George Dragons players